There are 92 counties in the U.S. state of Indiana. Each county serves as the local level of government within its borders. Although Indiana was organized into the United States since the Northwest Ordinance in 1787, its land was not always available for settlement. The Vincennes Tract, Clark's Grant and an area known as "The Gore" in southeastern Indiana (resulting from the Treaty of Greenville 1795) existed during the Northwest Territory. The remainder of Indiana land was acquired by Indian Removal Act and purchases by treaty between 1804 and 1840. The largest purchase (called "Delaware New Purchase" or just "New Purchase") resulted from the Treaty of St. Mary's (1818) which acquired about 1/3 of the state in the central portion. All or most of 35 counties were eventually carved from the area. The oldest counties are generally in the south near the Ohio River, whereas newer ones were in the north in territory acquired later. Many of the final counties were formed subsequent to the acquisition and break up of the Big Miami Reserve (encompassing present day Howard County and parts of surrounding counties) between 1834 and 1840. The oldest and newest counties in Indiana are Knox County, created in 1790, and Newton County, created in 1859.

As of the 2021 Census estimates, the population of Indiana was 6,805,985, the average population of Indiana's 92 counties is 73,978, with Marion County as the most populous (971,102), and Ohio County (5,978) the least. 54 counties have 30,000 or more people; 17 counties have populations exceeding 100,000, five of which exceed 250,000; and only six counties have fewer than 10,000 people. The largest county is Allen (657 sq. mi., 1,702 km2) and the smallest is Ohio (86 sq. mi., 223 km2).

County government in Indiana consists of two bodies, the county council and the commissioners.

Many Indiana counties are named for United States Founding Fathers and personalities of the American Revolutionary War, the War of 1812 and Battle of Tippecanoe; early leaders of Indiana Territory and Indiana, as well as surrounding states like Michigan and Kentucky; plus Native American tribes and geographical features.

The Federal Information Processing Standard (FIPS) code, which is used by the United States government to uniquely identify states and counties, is provided with each entry. Indiana's code is 18, which when combined with any county code would be written as 18XXX. The FIPS code for each county links to census data for that county.

In Indiana, the most commonly seen number associated with counties is the state county code, which is a sequential number based on the alphabetical order of the county.
It has been used on automobile license plates since 1963. It first held a prominent place on the left side of the plates as part of the license plate number until the year 2008 when it was moved above the serial number and 2012 when it was moved to the lower right corner. On license plates, county codes 93, 95, and 97-99 were also used for Marion County in addition to 49. 94 and 96 were used for Lake County in addition to 45. These additional numbers ceased to be used as of 2008. In addition these codes are also used by INDOT for structure IDs on objects such as bridges and overpasses.



Counties

|}

See also

 List of cities in Indiana
 List of former United States counties#Indiana
 List of Indiana townships
 Vehicle registration plates of Indiana

References

Sources

External links
 Association of Indiana Counties
 Census 2000 Gazetteer
 National Association of Counties

Indiana
Counties